Wolf Creek Colony is a Hutterite colony and census-designated place (CDP) in Hutchinson County, South Dakota, United States. The population was 0 at the 2020 census. It was first listed as a CDP prior to the 2020 census.

It is in the east-central part of the county, in the valley of Wolf Creek just north of where it flows into the James River.

Demographics

References 

Census-designated places in Hutchinson County, South Dakota
Census-designated places in South Dakota
Hutterite communities in the United States